Johann Karl Emmanuel Schenk (1 December 1823 – 18 July 1895) was a Swiss pastor, politician, and member of the Swiss Federal Council from 1863 until his death in 1895. Later in life he became one of the first leaders of the Swiss Red Cross.

Life and work 
Schenk was born in 1823 in Bern, Switzerland, as the son of Christian Schenk. At the age of eleven, he became an orphan and lived in Korntal (Germany). From 1839 to 1842 he attended school in Bern and then studied theology. He completed his studies at the age of 22. In 1845 he became vicar and later pastor at Schüpfen. In 1848, he married Elise Kähr. The couple had nine children, two of which died at young age.

He was elected to the Swiss Federal Council on 12 December 1863 and died in office 31 years later, on 18 July 1895. He was affiliated with the Free Democratic Party of Switzerland.

During his time in office he held the following departments:
Department of Home Affairs (1864)
Political Department (Foreign ministry) as President of the Confederation (1865)
Department of Home Affairs (1866 - 1870)
Political Department as President of the Confederation (1871)
Department of Home Affairs (1872)
Department of Finance (1872)
Department of Home Affairs (1873)
Political Department as President of the Confederation (1874)
Department of Railway and Trade (1875 - 1877)
Political Department as President of the Confederation (1878)
Department of Home Affairs (1879 - 1884)
Political Department as President of the Confederation (1885)
Department of Home Affairs (1886 - 1895)
He was President of the Confederation six times in 1865, 1871, 1874, 1878, 1885 and 1893.

Schenk also served as President of the Swiss Red Cross from 1873–1882.

Death and legacy 
Schenk died 1895 in Bern, and was buried at Bremgartenfriedhof.

The local museum of Langnau im Emmental "Chüechlihus" includes a section on him. Schenkstrasse in Bern is named after him. Further, the house at Spitalgasse 4 in the city of Bern is named Karl-Schenk-Haus and its passage Karl-Schenk-Haus-Passage or Karl-Schenk-Passage.

References

Further reading

External links

   
 
 
 
 

1823 births
1895 deaths
People from Bern
Swiss Calvinist and Reformed ministers
Free Democratic Party of Switzerland politicians
Foreign ministers of Switzerland
Finance ministers of Switzerland
Members of the Federal Council (Switzerland)
Members of the Council of States (Switzerland)
Presidents of the Council of States (Switzerland)
University of Bern alumni